The Old Man (translit. Shal) is a 2012 Kazakhstani drama film written and directed by Ermek Tursunov. The film was selected as the Kazakhstani entry for the Best Foreign Language Film at the 86th Academy Awards, but it was not nominated.

Cast
 Erbulat Toguzakov as Old Man

See also
 List of submissions to the 86th Academy Awards for Best Foreign Language Film
 List of Kazakhstani submissions for the Academy Award for Best Foreign Language Film

References

External links
 

2012 films
2012 drama films
Kazakh-language films
Kazakhstani drama films